Zion and Leith City are former unincorporated communities in Adair County, in the U.S. state of Iowa.

History
Zion, founded in the late 1800s in the center of Union Township, was home to the original Hill of Zion Christian Church, as well as a later replacement. The Zion Consolidated School District was formed in 1919.

Leith City (later spelled Leath City) was platted in 1902, less than a mile away from Zion in Sections 20 and 21. Advertisements for electrified plots of land in Leith City ran in the Iowa State Gazetteer and Business Directory in 1905. These communities did not incorporate.

Zion's population was just 6 in 1925. Hill of Zion Cemetery is located in Zion, adjacent to the church.

References

External links
 1930 Plat Map of Union Township in Adair County

Unincorporated communities in Adair County, Iowa
Unincorporated communities in Iowa